The gymnastics competitions at the 1967 Summer Universiade were held in Tokyo, Japan.

Men's events

Women's events

References

External links
 Universiade gymnastics medalists on HickokSports

1967 in gymnastics
1967 Summer Universiade
Gymnastics at the Summer Universiade